Varish (also Romanized as Vārīsh) is a village in Sulqan Rural District, Kan District, Tehran County, Tehran Province, Iran. At the 2006 census, its population was 56, in 15 families.

References 

Populated places in Tehran County